Sifiso Myeni (born 10 June 1988) is a South African association football player who last played as a right-winger for Bidvest Wits in the Premier Soccer League.He is currently signed by First Divisiin team VTM FC in Botswana

Honours
 Premier Soccer League 2016–17 
Bidvest Wits F.C
 MTN 8 
Supersport United F.C 2017
Orlando Pirates F.C 2014

External links 
 
 

1988 births
South African soccer players
Living people
Association football midfielders
Bidvest Wits F.C. players
Moroka Swallows F.C. players
Orlando Pirates F.C. players
SuperSport United F.C. players
TS Sporting F.C. players
National First Division players
South African Premier Division players
Sportspeople from Soweto
South Africa international soccer players